An insignia is a sign or mark distinguishing a group, grade, rank, or function.

Insignia may also refer to:
 Insignia trilogy, a series of young-adult science fiction novels by S. J. Kincaid
 MS Insignia, the lead ship of the R class of cruise ships built for Renaissance cruises
 Insignia Systems, Inc., a publicly traded U.S. corporation
 Opel Insignia, a large family car model
 Insignia, a brand of electronic equipment produced by Best Buy
 Insignia Financial Group, a real estate company in South Carolina